Further Complications, styled "Further complications.", is the second solo album by British musician Jarvis Cocker, released in the UK on 18 May 2009.

Background and production
In July 2008, Cocker met Steve Albini in Chicago at the Pitchfork Music Festival. Together they tested some songs, liked the sound and agreed to record an album together. Chicago performer Daniel Knox sings backing vocals on "Angela" and "Hold Still". The album has a heavier sound than debut Jarvis, something that Cocker attributes to realising his band "could rock", which led to him choosing to write with them. He told BBC 6 Music: "What I've tried to do with the new stuff, rather than me just sit there and wait for inspiration to come at some point – which takes ages – instead we've written stuff together. And it's a bit louder."

Promotion
On the day of the album's release, Cocker spent two hours working in HMV in London, selling and signing copies over the counter and giving customers his own personal advice and recommendations on their purchases.

Critical reception

The album attracted a positive response from critics, with AllMusic saying "the songs here pulsate with perversion, a middle-aged man making damn sure he's going to get with a tight 23-year-old body yet again," and declared it "impossible not to happily wallow in the flood of filth unleashed by Further Complications", whilst NME praised the album's "heavy-but-breathable fuzz-guitars and a granite-hard rock aesthetic, but with bluster bolted outside the studio door" and called the result "an absolute pleasure."

The Guardian highlighted other attributes, saying that "Further Complications is best when the music quietens, allowing the singer's glorious one-liners to be savoured", and Entertainment Weekly picked out Homewrecker! and "Further Complications" claiming that they "will come as a definite surprise to longtime Cocker watchers, though not necessarily a bad one", whilst deciding that Cocker's "droll wordplay" is "still the dominating factor" on such tracks as "I Never Said I Was Deep" and "Fuckingsong".

Track listing
The added quotation marks around "Further Complications." are purposefully there, as featured on the album's sleeve.

Personnel
Jarvis Cocker – vocals, guitar (tracks 3, 10), synthesiser (tracks 6, 8, 11), fire bell (track 4), bass guitar (track 6), electric mandolin (track 9)
Steve Mackey – bass guitar
Ross Orton – drums, timpani
Simon Stafford – keyboards, backing vocals, guitar, synthesiser
Tim McCall – guitar
Martin Craft – guitar, Vox Continental, piano
Steve Mackay – saxophone (track 6)

Chart positions

In 2009. It was awarded a silver certification from the Independent Music Companies Association which indicated sales of at least 30,000 copies throughout Europe.

References

2009 albums
Jarvis Cocker albums
Albums produced by Steve Albini
Rough Trade Records albums